Hammersmith Terrace is a street of listed, brick-built houses in Hammersmith,  west London. All of the  seventeen houses in the terrace are Grade II listed, except No. 7 which is Grade II*. The street was built in about 1770 and  has been home to several notable artists.

Past residents
No. 1 was home to the Doves Press in the first decade of the twentieth century.

No. 3 was once home to the actress and singer Rosemond Mountain (Mrs Mountain) (1768–1841). It was later home to the Arts and Crafts printer Emery Walker for 24 years, until he moved to no. 7 in 1903. The calligrapher Edward Johnston (1872–1944) lived here from 1905 to 1912 and is commemorated with a blue plaque.

No. 5 was lived in by the artist engraver William Harcourt Hooper, at least until 1911.

No. 6, owned by the Needham family, descendants of the inventor of the shotgun cartridge ejector mechanism, was where the writer J. R. Ackerley took up residence in 1925.

7 Hammersmith Terrace was home to the Arts and Crafts printer Emery Walker from 1903 to 1933. It is now a museum.

No. 8 was home to May Morris, William Morris's daughter, and then the artist Mary Annie Sloane.

No. 10 was home to the art critic Frederic George Stephens.

No. 11 was the home of the Quaker politician T. Edmund Harvey (1875–1955) and his wife, Alice Irene, from 1911 to 1916, and from then the home and office of architect Fred Rowntree (1860–1927).

No. 12 was home to A. P. Herbert, humorist, novelist, playwright and law reform activist until his death in 1971.

No. 13 was home to the artist Philip James de Loutherbourg until his death there in 1812.

No. 15 was lived in by Sir Clifton Wintringham (1720–1794), physician to the King.

The writer Arthur Murphy (1727–1805) lived there for many years.

References

Streets in the London Borough of Hammersmith and Fulham
Grade II listed houses in London
Grade II listed buildings in the London Borough of Hammersmith and Fulham